Boris Vladimirovich Balmont (6 October 1927 – 16 February 2022) was a Russian politician.

He was Minister of the Machine Tool and Tool Industry of the USSR from 1981 to 1986. Member of the Presidium of the Russian Academy of Cosmonautics. He died on 16 February 2022, at the age of 94.

References

1927 births
2022 deaths
20th-century Russian politicians
Soviet politicians
Soviet mechanical engineers
People from Shuya
Tenth convocation members of the Supreme Soviet of the Soviet Union
Eleventh convocation members of the Soviet of Nationalities
Communist Party of the Soviet Union members
Central Committee of the Communist Party of the Soviet Union members
Central Committee of the Communist Party of the Soviet Union candidate members
Bauman Moscow State Technical University alumni
Heroes of Socialist Labour
Recipients of the Order of Lenin
Recipients of the Order of Honour (Russia)
Recipients of the USSR State Prize